Laundryheap is an English company that operates an online laundry delivery service.

History 
Laundryheap was founded in London in 2014 by Deyan Dimitrov.

In 2020, the company began operating in Singapore, the United States and the Middle East.

In February 2021, the company sold additional shares to venture capitalists for £2.5 million, to pay for growth and expand its fleet of electric delivery vehicles.

Laundrapp, a UK-based competitor, was acquired by Laundryheap in April 2022 for an undisclosed sum of money.

References 

Companies based in London
Service companies of the United Kingdom
Laundry businesses
British companies established in 2014